Madhu Eravankara is a film director, film critic, film scholar,film jury, film teacher, and author. He was born in Eravankara in Alappuzha District, Kerala, India.

Filmmaker
He has directed the feature film Nankooram and around thirty  documentaries including Nishadam (IFFK-2004, CFF-2004, DFF-2004 & BIFF- 2005),The Milky Way, The story of PDDP, Adoor Gopalakrishnan, Asmara -The City of Dreams ( Eritrea),  Victims of Silence (Eritrea), Punarakhyanam, Punarjjani, Kerala Paninini, Razia, Kettukazcha, Kuthiyottam, Chettikulangara Amma, The Leader,The Festival of Pagodas and The Journey-Swayamvaram at Fifty that have received state, national and international acclaim. He has directed a docufiction- Pakalmazha (Day Rain) for the Social Welfare Board, Govt. of Kerala. Magic Wheel, his documentary was made as a part of the workshop conducted in Indian School, Bahrain.

Awards
He is the recipient National Film Award (1999), State Film Awards(1999 & 2003), Film Critics Awards (2000, 2002, 2003, 2012 & 2014), State Television Award ( 2007), AFFMA International Documentary Film Award-2012, Greens-2012 Award for Environmental films, Kozhikodan Award for the Best Book on Cinema-2016 and MAMI Book Award for Excellence in wrIting on Cinema ( 2018)  He has also been awarded a Senior Fellowship for Outstanding Artists, from the Indian Government’s Department of Culture (2000-2002), Fellowship from National Film Archive of India (1989–90) to research on Malayalam Literature and Cinema and awarded Minor Research Project from UGC to do research on Malayalam Theatre and Cinemna ( 2007-2009), and from National Film Archive of India Monograph Research project on Ramu Kariattu.

Author
SNANAGHATTANGAL (Short story), MALAYALA CINEMAYUM SAHITYAVUM (Film Study),Co-Translator of the book   SAMSKARAM, YUKTI, SAMOOHAM by Nobel Laureate Amartya Sen, Contributor of Technical terms related to Film and Television Media to Sabdasagaram (Vol. I, II, III & IV), the Thesaurus in Malayalam Language, ALIVINTE MANDARANGAL (Film Studies), SALABHAYATRAKAL (Travel), NISHADAM (Film Script), MALAYALACINEMAYILE AVISMARANEEYAR (Film History), 
Contributor to Technical terms related to Film and Television Media to SABDATHARAVALI, the Thesaurus in Malayalam Language,	BARLEY VAYALUKALE ULAKKUNNA KATTU (Film Studies), KALATHINTE ADARUKAL (Film Studies),LOKACINEMAYUDE MOONAM KANNU (Film Studies),INDIAN CINEMA- 100 VARSHAM 100 CINEMA ( Film History),GREESHMAYATRAKAL (Travel), JALAGEHANGALUM SAVAMURIKALUM (Film Studies), SISIRAYATRAKAL (Travel),HEMANTHA YATRAKAL (Travel), ASHADA YATRAKAL (Travel), KAZCHAYUDE MOONAMIDANGAL ( Film Studies) and ABSOLUTE QUIZ BOOK ON MOVIES ( Film History)

Professional and Public Activities 
Formerly he was Prof. & Head, Dept. of Chemistry, Catholicate College Pathanamthitta ( M.G.University), Prof.& Head, Dept.of Film Studies, Thunchathezhuthachan Malayalam University and Media Director, Audiovisual Institute of Eritrea ( North East Africa).
He has been in the organising committees and selection committees of International Film Festival of Kerala (IFFK) and International Documentary and Short Film Festival of Kerala  ( IDSFK).
He was the Chairman of Narendra Prasad Smaraka Nataka Padana Gaveshana Kendram, Dept. of Culture, Govt, of Kerala and Governing board member, State Institute of Encyclopaedic Publications. He was the former Secretary of the Indian Chapter of International Film Critic Federation ( FIPRESCI). Currently serves as the Chairman of Documentary Film Maker's Forum of Kerala ( DFFK), Chairman of Eravankara Neelakantan Unnithan and Kochukunjunnithan Smaraka Samithi ( ENCOS),Member, Board of Studies, Dept. of Film Studies, Thunchathezhuthachan Malayalam University, Kerala, Member, FIPRESCI- India and Member, Malayalam Cine Technician's Association ( MACTA)

Jury
Served as Jury in the International Film Festivals of Mumbai, Yamagata, Brisbane, Istanbul, Toronto, Mannheim-Heidelberg, Busan, Abu Dhabi, Bangalore, Hyderabad, Taipei, Kerala, St.Petersberg and Dhaka

See also
Film Critics Circle of India
FIPRESCI

References

External links
Page on the FIPRESCI site
Page on the Film Critics Circle of India site
Page on the British Film Institute site
At a Press meet: YouTube video

Writers from Kerala
Indian film critics
Living people
1954 births